This is an alphabetical list of notable Pakistani actresses related to the film and television industry.

A 

Aasia
Armeena Khan
 Aaminah Haq             
 Aamina Sheikh
Aiman Khan
 Ainy Jaffri
 Alishba Yousuf                          
 Angeline Malik
 Anjuman
 Anjuman Shehzadi
 Anum Fayyaz
 Anoushey Ashraf
 Arjumand Rahim
 Arisha Razi
 Asha Posley
 Atiqa Odho
 Ayesha Khan
 Ayesha Omar              
 Ayesha Sana
 Ayeza Khan           
 Azra Sherwani
 Arij Fatyma

B 

 Babra Sharif
 Badar Khalil
 Bahar Begum
 Begum Khurshid Mirza
 Bushra Ansari
 Bushra Farrukh

D 

 Deeba
 Deedar

F 

 Farah Shah
 Fatima Effendi Kanwar
 Fazila Qazi

G 

 Ghana Ali
 Gori

H 

 Hajra Yamin
 Hareem Farooq
 Hina Dilpazeer
 Hina Shaheen
 Humaima Malik
 Husna
 Hania Amir

I 

 Iffat Rahim
 Iman Ali
 Ismat Zaidi
 Iqra Aziz

J 

 Jana Malik
 Javeria Abbasi
 Javeria Saud
 Juggan Kazim

K 

 Kaveeta
 Khalida Riyasat
 Khushboo
 Komal Rizvi

L 

 Laila Khan
 Laila Zuberi

M 

 Madeeha Gauhar
 Madiha Iftikhar
 Madiha Imam
 Madiha Shah
 Maham Amir
 Mahira Khan
 Maheen Rizvi
 Mahnoor
 Mahnoor Baloch
 Maira Khan
 Mansha Pasha                         
 Maria Wasti
 Marina Khan
 Mariyam Khalif
 Maryam Fatima
 Maryam Nafees
 Mathira
 Mawra Hocane
 Maya Ali
 Meera                  
 Meesha Shafi
 Mehr Hassan
 Mehreen Raheel
 Mehwish Hayat
 Mishi Khan
 Mizna Waqas
 Momal Sheikh
 Musarrat Nazir
 Musarrat Shaheen

N 

 Nadira
 Nadia Afghan
 Nadia Hussain
 Nadia Khan
 Nadia Jamil
 Naheed Shabbir
 Nargis
 Naveen Tajik
 Naveen Waqar
 Nayyar Sultana
 Neelam Muneer
 Neeli
 Neelo
 Nida Yasir
 Nimra Bucha
 Nirma
 Noor Bukhari
 Noor Jehan

Q 
 Qandeel Baloch

R 

 Rabia Butt
 Rani
 Reema Khan
 Resham
 Rozina
 Rubina Ashraf
 Rubya Chaudhry

S 
* Sabreen Hisbani
 Saba Hameed
 Saba Qamar
 Sabiha Khanum
 Saboor Ali
 Sadia Imam
 Saeeda Imtiaz
 Sahiba Afzal
 Saima Noor
 Saira Khan
 Sajal Ali
 Salma Mumtaz
 Salma Agha 
 Saloni
 Samina Ahmad
 Samina Peerzada
 Samiya Mumtaz
 Sana Askari
 Sana Nawaz
 Saman Ansari
 Sanam Baloch
 Sanam Chaudhry
 Sanam Jung
 Sanam Saeed
 Sangeeta
 Sania Saeed
 Sara Loren
 Sarah Khan
 Sarwat Gilani
 Savera Nadeem
 Shabnam
 Shagufta Ejaz
 Shamim Ara
 Shamim Bano
 Shehnaz Sheikh
 Sitara
 Sobia Khan
 Sohai Ali Abro
 Somy Ali
 Sonia Khan
 Sonia Mishal
 Sonya Jehan
 Sumbul Iqbal
 Suzain Fatima
 Swaran Lata
 Syra Yousuf

T
Tooba Siddiqui

U 

 Ushna Shah
 Uzra Butt
 Urwa Hocane

V 

 Vaneeza Ahmad
 Veena Malik

Y 

 Yumna Zaidi

Z 

 Zainub Qayyum
Zara Noor Abbas
 Zara Sheikh
 Zeba
 Zeba Ali
 Zeba Bakhtiar
 Zhalay Sarhadi
 Zarnish Khan

See also 

 List of Pakistani male actors
 List of Pakistani models

References 

Actresses
Pakistani actresses
Pakistani
Actresses